Lawrence Naumoff (born July 23, 1946) is a fiction writer who currently lives in Carrboro, North Carolina. He was born in Charlotte, North Carolina and was educated at the University of North Carolina, where he currently teaches in the Creative Writing Program.

Early in his career he published several stories under the pseudonym Peter Nesovich.

His novel, Taller Women, a Cautionary Tale, was a New York Times Notable Book of the Year in 1992.
His most recent book, A Southern Tragedy, in Crimson and Yellow, although a novel and set over a number of years, is partially based on the true story of the 1991 Hamlet chicken processing plant fire. The book was awarded the 2005 Walter Raleigh Award for the best work of fiction by a North Carolina author.

Other prizes garnered by Naumoff include a Whiting Award, a Thomas Wolfe Memorial Award, a National Endowment for the Arts Discovery Award, and the Carolina Quarterly Fiction Award.

Bibliography 
The Night of the Weeping Women (1988)
Rootie Kazootie (1990)
Taller Women, a Cautionary Tale (1992) - New York Times Notable Book of the Year, 1992
Silk Hope, NC (1994)
A Plan for Women (1997)
A Southern Tragedy, in Crimson and Yellow (2005)
The Longest Mobile Home in the Blue Ridge Mountains (2010) (ebook)
The Cashmere Sweater and Other Stories (2011) (ebook)
The Beautiful Couple and Other Stories (2011) (ebook)

References

Sources
Flora, Vogel, and Bryan, Southern Writers: A New Biographical Dictionary, LSU Press 2006.

External links
University of North Carolina entry
Personal Web site Lawrencenaumoff.com
Profile at The Whiting Foundation

20th-century American novelists
21st-century American novelists
American male novelists
Living people
1946 births
20th-century American male writers
21st-century American male writers